This was the seventh season for the competition, from this season the League Cup was known as the John Player Trophy for sponsorship reasons.

Warrington won the trophy, beating Widnes in the final by the score of 9-4. The match was played at Knowsley Road, St Helens, Merseyside. The attendance was 10,258 and receipts were £8429.

Background 
This season saw no changes in the  entrants, no new members and no withdrawals, the number remaining at eighteen.
This was the  second successive season in which there were no drawn matches.
The title of the competition was changed from the previous "Players No 6 Trophy" to the "John Player Trophy"

Competition and results

Round 1 - First  Round 

Involved  16 matches and 32 Clubs

Round 2 - Second  Round 

Involved  8 matches and 16 Clubs

Round 3 -Quarter Finals 

Involved 4 matches with 8 clubs

Round 4 – Semi-Finals 

Involved 2 matches and 4 Clubs

Final

Teams and scorers 

Scoring - Try = three points - Goal = two points - Drop goal = one point

Prize money 
As part of the sponsorship deal and funds, the  prize money awarded to the competing teams for this season is as follows :-

Note - the  author is unable to trace the award amounts for this season. Can anyone help ?

The road to success 
This tree excludes any preliminary round fixtures

Notes and comments 
1 * (NDLB) National Dock Labour Board are a Junior (amateur) club from Hull
2 * Wigan official archives gives the score as 3-18 but RugbyleaguePROJECTS, Rothmans Yearbook 1991-92 and the News of the World/Empire News ANNUAL OF 1978–79 give it as 4-18
3 * Wigan official archives gives the score as 24-3 but RugbyleaguePROJECTS, Wakefield until I die and the News of the World/Empire News Annual 1978–79 give it as 24-5
4 * Cawoods were a Junior (amateur) club from Hull
5 * Cawoods became the first amateur team to beat a professional team in a Rugby League cup tie since 1909
6 * Wigan official archives gives the score as 23-6 but RugbyleaguePROJECTS, Widnes official archives and the News of the World/Empire News annual 1978–79  give it as 22-6
7 * Wigan First Team Players continued with their strike over a bonus payment for the JP second round win over New Hunslet. Wigan chairman Ken Broome issued a statement saying "The situation is bordering on ridiculous. It's beyond money now, it's become a question of whether the players are going to run the club or we are." The actual dispute was over just £5 a man, the club having increased the bonus offer from £55 to £70 but the players wanted £75. 
8  * Knowsley Road was the home of St Helens R.F.C. from 1890 until its closure in 2010. The final capacity was 17,500 although the record attendance was 35,695 set on 26 December 1949 for a league game between St Helens and Wigan.

General information for those unfamiliar 
The council of the Rugby Football League voted to introduce a new competition, to be similar to The Football Association and Scottish Football Association's "League Cup". It was to be a similar knock-out structure to, and to be secondary to, the Challenge Cup. As this was being formulated, sports sponsorship was becoming more prevalent and as a result John Player and Sons, a division of Imperial Tobacco Company, became sponsors, and the competition never became widely known as the "League Cup".
The competition ran from 1971–72 until 1995–96 and was initially intended for the professional clubs plus the two amateur BARLA National Cup finalists. In later seasons the entries were expanded to take in other amateur and French teams. The competition was dropped due to "fixture congestion" when Rugby League became a summer sport.
The Rugby League season always (until the onset of "Summer Rugby" in 1996) ran from around August-time through to around May-time and this competition always took place early in the season, in the autumn, with the final usually taking place in late January.
The competition was variably known, by its sponsorship name, as the Player's No.6 Trophy (1971–1977), the John Player Trophy (1977–1983), the John Player Special Trophy (1983–1989), and the Regal Trophy in 1989.

See also 
1977–78 Northern Rugby Football League season
1977 Lancashire Cup
1977 Yorkshire Cup
John Player Trophy
Rugby league county cups

References

External links
Saints Heritage Society
1896–97 Northern Rugby Football Union season at wigan.rlfans.com 
Hull&Proud Fixtures & Results 1896/1897
Widnes Vikings - One team, one passion Season In Review - 1896-97
The Northern Union at warringtonwolves.org
Huddersfield R L Heritage
Wakefield until I die

1977 in English rugby league
1978 in English rugby league
League Cup (rugby league)